The Legal Secretary of Ceylon, was an officer of state of the British Colonial Administration of Ceylon from 1931 to 1947, appointed from the Colonial Legal Service. The Legal Secretary one of three officers of state of the Board of Ministers of the State Council of Ceylon, who serve as the legal advisor to the government; administration of justice; criminal prosecutions and civil proceeding on behalf of the crown; election to the State Council, drafting of legislature and the public trustee. The post was formed under recommendations of the Donoughmore Commission the post replaced the Attorney General as the chief legal advisor to the Governor, it was in turn replaced by the post of Minister of Justice in 1947 under the recommendations of the Soulbury Commission under the Ceylon Independence Act, 1947 and The Ceylon (Constitution and Independence) Orders in Council 1947.

Departments
 Attorney General's Department
 The Fiscals
 The Public Trustee
 Legal Draftsman 
 District Courts
 Courts of Requests
 Magistrate's courts
 Village Tribunals

List of Legal Secretaries
 Edward St John Jackson (1932-1936) - Legal Secretary and Attorney General
 John Curtois Howard (1936-1940)
 Robert Harry Drayton (1940-1942)
 John Harry Barclay Nihill (1942-1946)

See also
 Chief Secretary of Ceylon
 Financial Secretary of Ceylon

References

Legal Secretary of Ceylon
Defunct government positions in Sri Lanka
Law of Sri Lanka